Dayao is a genus of rove beetles.

Species
 Dayao emeiensis Yin & Li in Yin, Hlavac and Li, 2013
 Dayao pengzhongi Yin, Li & Zhao, 2011

References

External links 
Encyclopedia of Life entry

Pselaphitae
Pselaphinae genera
Endemic fauna of China